Angelique Westerhof (1969, Vorden, the Netherlands) is the director of the Dutch Fashion Foundation and co-founder of the fashion master course Fashion Institute Arnhem. She is regarded as a pioneer and one of the key members in the development of the Dutch fashion climate since the 1990s.

In 1998 Westerhof was asked by the Arnhem Academy of Art and Design (ArtEZ) to set up the one year fashion master course Fashion Institute Arnhem (FIA) together with fashion illustrator Pieter ‘t Hoen, also known as Piet Paris. Westerhof and ‘t Hoen both had a large network in the international fashion industry and strived to set up contacts between young, talented designers and the international fashion scene. The Fashion Institute Arnhem's focus lay abroad, with workshops in several countries by leading professionals and a graduation show in Paris attended by the international fashion press.

In 2000 Westerhof observed that fashion designers who had graduated from the Fashion Institute Arnhem had difficulties presenting their collection to a wider audience, set up their own fashion labels and find a connection with the fashion industry on their own. She established the Dutch Fashion Foundation in 2001 to develop the status of Dutch fashion as a collective discipline in the Netherlands and abroad.

References 

https://www.nrc.nl/nieuws/2015/10/15/modestichting-1-miljoen-subsidie-doelen-niet-gehaald-a1412340

1969 births
Living people
Dutch fashion